Chaqan (also Romanized as Chāqān) is a village in Shirin Su Rural District, Maneh District, Maneh and Samalqan County, North Khorasan Province, Iran. At the 2006 census, its population was 161, in 36 families.

References 

Populated places in Maneh and Samalqan County